Andi Lila (born 12 February 1986) is a former Albanian professional footballer who played as a defensive midfielder for the Albania national team. He was a versatile player, having played primarily as a right back early in his career as well as left back, but in recent years he played predominately in a defensive midfield role, as well as a right midfielder.

Lila began his career with local side Besa Kavajë, where he made his debut in 2002 as a 16-year-old and soon became a regular first team player, which earned him a move to Greek club Iraklis in January 2007. He soon returned to Besa Kavajë after failing to settle at Iraklis, and he shortly became the club captain, guiding them to a third-place finish in the Albanian Superliga before moving to KF Tirana after just one year back in Kavajë. He was a fan favourite at KF Tirana as during his three years at the club, and he won the Albanian Superliga title in his first season there, as well as helping his side reach the Albanian Cup final which he missed and his side lost in. His last game with the club came in the 2011 Albanian Cup final which his side lost on penalties after extra time, before moving to Greece for a second stint, this time with PAS Giannina.

He quickly established himself in the first team at PAS Giannina and helped his side achieve a mid table finish in his first season back in Greece, and then reach the Superleague playoffs in his second season at the club before a bottom half finish in his third season. He joined struggling Serie A side Parma on loan for the second half of the 2014–15 campaign, but he could not help the club escape relegation and returned to his parent club PAS Giannina following the bankruptcy of Parma. Since his return he has struggled to recapture his place in the first team, and has been limited to mostly substitute appearances in the league.

Lila has represented Albania at under-17, under-19, under-21 and senior levels. He made his senior international debut in 2007 against Romania and has since earned 59 caps but has yet to score a senior international goal. He became Albania's first choice right back in 2010 under Josip Kuže, and he also began to play in the defensive midfield position. Under Gianni De Biasi he has primarily played as a right midfielder or right winger since 2014, and he has helped Albania qualify for its first major international tournament as they reached Euro 2016. He was also heavily involved in the infamous Serbia v Albania match on 14 October 2014, which resulted in the match being abandoned and Albania eventually being awarded a walkover victory over Serbia.

Club career

Besa Kavajë
Lila started his career with hometown club, Besa Kavajë. He made his debut for the club during the 2002–03 season in the Albanian Superliga on 14 December 2002 in an away match against Teuta Durrës. Lila came on as a substitute at half time by replacing Ervin Bardhi. However it was not a game to remember for the young Lila as it finished 5–0 to Teuta Durrës.

Iraklis
Lila's performances at right-back paved the way for his move to Greek club Iraklis in January 2007, where he joined fellow Albanians, Enea Koliçi, Elvis Kaja and Indrit Fortuzi. Despite making his dream move abroad a reality, Lila struggled to settle in Greece and after only 6 months and 3 appearances he moved back to his original club Besa Kavajë.

Return to Besa Kavajë
Following his return, he was made captain of the team. During the 2007–08 season he played 26 times without scoring a goal. The team also was defeated at the 2007 Albanian Supercup by Tirana. Lila played his final match with Besa in the Intertoto Cup against Grasshopper which finished in a 0–3 loss.

Tirana

Lila completed his move to Tirana on 21 July 2008 after him and his agent Sokol Haxhia agreed to terms with the capital club and its president Refik Halili. His first game as a Tirana player was the opening game of the season against Vllaznia Shkodër in which he played full-90 minutes of the goalless draw. His first score-sheet contributions with the team came on 14 September in his third appearance in the capital derby against Partizani Tirana, netting a later winner to hand his team the three points.

Lila didn't have to wait long for another goal as it came less than a week later on 20 September 2008 against Apolonia Fier, his goal came in the 28th minute of the game. During the entire 2008–09 season he became the club's first choice right back and he played 29 games, he also proved that he has attacking qualities as well by scoring 4 goals during the campaign. Tirana concluded the league season by winning its 24 title in history, leaving Vllaznia Shkodër four points behind. Tirana also went into the final of 2008–09 Albanian Cup, where "The White and Blues" were defeated 2–1 by Flamurtari Vlorë, in a match where Lila was an unused substitute.

Lila started his second season with Tirana on 15 July 2009 by making his European debut with Tirana against Stabæk in the first leg of 2009–10 UEFA Champions League's first round. He was a starter even in the returning leg with Tirana slumped into a 4–0 defeat at Telenor Arena, crashing out of competition 1–5 on aggregate. Later, on 16 August, Lila won his second silverware at Tirana, the Albanian Supercup, where he aided the team to beat Flamurtari Vlorë 1–0 at Qemal Stafa Stadium.

PAS Giannina
Lila completed a transfer to Greek side PAS Giannina on 24 June 2011 by signing a three-year contract worth €200,000 plus bonuses.

He was given squad number 3 and made his competitive debut on 27 August by starting in the goalless draw against Aris Thessaloniki in the opening week of 2011–12 Superleague Greece. In his first full season at Ajax of Epirus Lila contributed with 21 league appearances, scoring no goals as the team finished 8th in championship. With 8 yellow cards, Lila had the second worst disciplinary record within the team.

Lila begun his second season on 25 August 2012 by playing in the 0–0 draw versus Platanias at Zosimades Stadium. He made his first Greek Football Cup appearance later on 29 November in the 1–0 win against Panserraikos in the first leg of third round. His first score-sheet contributions for the club came later on 8 December as he netted the opener of the 0–2 win at Kerkyra. His second of the season came on 24 January of the following year in the second leg of Greek Football Cup against Fostiras, leading his team into a 2–3 win and progression to quarter-finals. He concluded his second season in Greece by playing 35 matches between league and cup, as PAS Giannina finished 5th in championship and was eliminated by Olympiacos at the quarter-finals of cup. Once again he had the second worst disciplinary record within the team.

On 12 July 2014, Lila had even declared that his contract with PAS Giannina had come to an end, allowing him to sign a contract with Croatian side HNK Rijeka, however, he eventually opted against this and signed a new three-year contract with PAS Giannina .

Loan to Parma
On 28 December 2014, Lila was sent on loan at Serie A club Parma. The transfer was made official on 1 January 2015 when the transfer window reopened. During his presentation, Lila stated that moving to Serie A is a dream come true, adding that Serie A is the best league in the world. Eleven days later, the club announced that the deal temporary with an option to purchase, due to ongoing financial difficulties of the club.

He made his debut for Parma on 14 January 2015, starting in the Coppa Italia match against Cagliari. After 13 minutes, however, Lila was forced off the field with a thigh muscle problem. In his first game back after returning from injury, Lila scored his first goal for Parma against Sassuolo on 15 March 2015; having played from the start, with the match ending as a 4–1 defeat for the Gialloblù.

Return to PAS Giannina
After his loan spell at Parma ended, Lila initially refused to return with the hopes of finding a new club in Serie A. He then begun training with Albanian side Skënderbeu Korçë in the first days of August 2015 in order to maintain his form. After that, Lila left the team to returning to parent club PAS Giannina for the new season, where he was acollated his old squad number 3.

He made his 100th Superleague Greece on 24 January 2016 by playing 70th minutes in the 0–2 win against Atromitos.

Lila started the 2016–17 season by making his Europa League debut for the club on 14 July 2016 by starting in the first leg of first qualifying round against Odds BK as the team achieved a comfortable 3–0 win. He also played in the returning leg a week later as PAS Giannina won at extra-time after regular time ended 3–0. Lila ended his European campaign with 4 matches after the team was eliminated by AZ Alkmaar in the second qualifying round.

On 25 March 2017, Lila was recorded making fun with a certain Greek priest while on international duties. This led the club to ask for his contract to be terminated. Three days later, he reacted and apologised for the incident, stating that his behaviour was "extremely inappropriate". Lila then went to personally meet the priest and to apologize to him in person, also giving him a gift. On 1 April, he was left on bench in the 1–1 home draw versus Xanthi. He returned on the starting lineup four days later by playing 64 minutes in the 3–0 loss at Veria, and scored his first of the campaign later that month, an opener in an eventual 1–1 home draw against AEK Athens in the matchday 30. He concluded his 6th season with the club by making 22 appearances in all competitions.

On 21 July 2017, Lila signed a new contract until June 2020. On 1 July 2019 Lila mutual solved his contract with the club.

International career

Lila was first called up to the Albania national team by Otto Baric in late 2007; it was his performances as a right back for Besa Kavajë in the Albanian Superliga that caught the eye of the Croatian. He made his debut for the senior team in a Euro 2008 qualifiers against Romania in Bucharest on 21 November 2007. Lila started the game at right back and played the full 90 minutes. However it was not a debut to remember because the match ended 6–1 to Romania and the coach that had called the young defender up to the senior squad quit as the head coach of the Albania national team just one hour after the final whistle of the embarrassing defeat.

The next manager of the national team also liked Lila's play and this earned him a call up by Arie Haan to his first game in charge which was a friendly against Poland on 27 May 2008. Lila started the game but was substituted at half time for Endrit Vrapi. The game ended in a 1–0 loss but the Albanians played well after conceding in the 3rd minute. Andi Lila managed to play another two games under Arie Haan, in a friendly against Liechtenstein and a 2010 World Cup qualifier against Malta. In both matches he came on as a substitute.

Lila was regular in Albania's successful UEFA Euro 2016 qualifying campaign. He played in the last 15 minutes of the opening Group I match versus Portugal as Albania achieved a historic 0–1 win at Estádio Municipal, the first ever win against "Seleção das Quinas". Later in October 2014 Lila was a protagonist in the match against Serbia, which was also his 50th international appearance; he played as a starter until 42nd minute where the match was postponed due to Serbian fans launching flares onto the pitch. He along with other Albanian players were attacked by Serbian hooligans who came onto the pitch with chairs and other objects. Initially, UEFA awarded Serbia with a 3–0 win, but were deducted three points, leading both Serbia and Albania appeals to the Court of Arbitration for Sport, who on 10 July 2015, awarded Albania with a 3–0 victory and Serbia were still deducted three points.

After winning 0–3 at Vazgen Sargsyan Republican Stadium against Armenia on 11 October 2015, Albania's spot at UEFA Euro 2016 was confirmed as team finished second in Group I with 14 points. On 21 May 2016, Lila was named in Albania's preliminary 27-man squad for UEFA Euro 2016, and in Albania's final 23-man UEFA Euro 2016 squad on 31 May.

Lila was an unused substitute in the opening Group A match against Switzerland as Albania fall 0–1. His first European Championship appearance occurred later 16 June against hosts of France that won the match 2–0 at the last minutes. Lilaj also played as starter in last group match against Romania as Albania won 1–0 for first victory in a major football tournament. It was Albania's first win over Romania since 1948. Albania finished the group in the third position with three points and with a goal difference –2, and was ranked last in the third-placed teams, which eventually eliminated them.

Personal life
He is married with Ornela Lila, and they become parents for the first time on 20 March 2015 when Lila's wife gave birth to the couple's first son, named Ayan. On 16 July 2015 Lila was decorated with the "Honorary Citizen of Kavaja" award for protecting the national symbols and for his contribution to Albanian football. In an interview, Lila stated that his favourite club while growing up was Italian side Internazionale. He is also a fan of American heavy metal band Metallica and English rock band The Beatles.

Career statistics

Club

International

Honours

Club
Tirana
 Albanian Superliga: 2008–09, 2019–20 
 Albanian Cup: 2010–11

Decoration

Honorary citizen of Kavajë: 2015

References

External links

 Andi Lila – Euro 2016 profile at FSHF.org

1986 births
Living people
Footballers from Kavajë
Albanian footballers
Association football defenders
Association football midfielders
Besa Kavajë players
Iraklis Thessaloniki F.C. players
KF Tirana players
PAS Giannina F.C. players
Parma Calcio 1913 players
Kategoria Superiore players
Super League Greece players
Serie A players
Albania under-21 international footballers
Albania youth international footballers
Albania international footballers
Albanian expatriate footballers
Expatriate footballers in Greece
Albanian expatriate sportspeople in Greece
Expatriate footballers in Italy
Albanian expatriate sportspeople in Italy
UEFA Euro 2016 players